Jeremy Elbertson (born September 22, 1985), better known as Jerma985 or  mononymously as Jerma, is an American live streamer, YouTuber, and voice actor known for his elaborate, "borderline surreal" engagement-based livestreams on Twitch.

Early life and education 
Jerma was born on September 22, 1985, to Irish and Polish parents. Upon receiving a Bachelor of Science in communication studies, Jerma became a substitute teacher, and was a freelance wedding videographer.

Jerma resided in Boston, Massachusetts until 2018, when he moved to Las Vegas, Nevada.

Career

Pre-Newgrounds 
Jerma previously owned a now defunct website called "jermanet.com". It contained video and audio clips, largely from his college years.

Voice acting 
In 2005, Jerma created an account on Newgrounds, on which he frequented the Voice Acting Club board of the NG Forum "Clubs & Crews" and discussed voice acting work with other forum members. The only piece of media appearing on his now abandoned profile was voice acting work on Shaun McGlinn's "Salty Swamp", where he plays Loke the Village Idiot, along with numerous other characters. McGlinn, also known by his online alias Blordow, would later produce original animations and music for Jerma's YouTube and Twitch.

He has given his voice to characters in multiple indie games, such as "Matt" in Galactic Phantasy Prelude, the Engineer in Cryptark, and the Horse Lord Hipparchos in Apotheon.

YouTube 
Jerma created his YouTube channel, Jerma985, on June 11, 2011. His content primarily focused on the video game Team Fortress 2, which he used to help raise money for the non-profit organization Camp One Step.

On October 8, 2011, Jerma announced his partnership with the online entertainment network Machinima.

In March 2014, Jerma released the first "Jerma Rumble", an annual production which used the WWE 2K games to make primarily quirky or strange characters, often based on characters from Jerma's past videos and live streams, and watch them wrestle in-game. In August 2016, Jerma released a live-action wrestling sketch as that year's Jerma Rumble. In 2015, he played multiple low quality Grand Theft Auto clones through the Apple app store, which is to date his most-viewed video.

Twitch 
Jerma did not fully transition into Twitch streaming until 2016. He primarily streams video games (such as The Sims) while interacting with viewers in the chat. After transitioning to Twitch as a main platform, he became well known for his "unconventional streams" and green screen performances, which fans used to edit comedic videos.

On September 21, 2019, Jerma hosted a real-life "robot carnival" stream that used viewer-controlled robots, allowing members of the live stream chat to control the aim in carnival games such as ring toss and dunk tank.

In March 2021, Jerma hosted a real-life archaeology and geology stream with a paleontologist from the Nevada Science Center. In the stream, he "unearthed" Grotto Beasts!, a fictitious trading card game from the 1990s based on Pokémon. The cards were produced in collaboration with multiple artists. Fans played along with the joke, producing fan art in the form of found footage-style art, such as a website for the eponymous card game made to resemble a GeoCities webpage from the 1990s. In early 2022, Jerma donated $10,000 to the Nevada Science Center.

In August 2021, Jerma began his real-life The Sims-inspired "Dollhouse" streams, which he described as his "biggest project yet". The first of three streams, entitled "The Jerma985 Dollhouse", was aired on August 18 and began with a prerecorded video of Jerma choosing his outfit. The streams allowed viewers to control Jerma's actions similar to the way one would control a Sims character: keep him fed, happy, healthy and energetic. The Dollhouse series is notable for its high production value as well as the level of control that viewers were allowed to have over the events of the stream. These streams used a combination of visual effects and a real set.

On February 1, 2022, Jerma livestreamed the "Who Will Replace ME?" show on Twitch. The show featured various actors playing the parts of aspiring individuals auditioning for the chance to take over Jerma's Twitch channel. Viewers were able to vote for the winner and chose actor Ryan Manuel's character, "#13", in a Twitch poll. On February 4, 2022, Jerma featured the character "#13" on his channel again in a follow-up stream of the character commentating over Destiny 2 gameplay, pretending to have taken over Jerma's channel.

In early 2022, Jerma signed a partnership deal with Evolved Talent Agency to help fund his upcoming large-stream events, which are each an expensive venture for him to produce. The 2019 "Carnival Stream" cost over $40,000, and The Jerma985 Dollhouse cost even more, requiring a sponsorship deal with Coinbase.

On August 19, 2022, Jerma hosted a streamed baseball game at CarShield Field, featuring the fictitious Jerma Baseball Association. He later compared the game to a  "live comedy improv show". During the stream, two fictitious and comedic baseball teams, the Maryland Magicians and the California Circus (the teams were made up of semi-professional baseball players and circus performers), played a modified game of baseball with various gimmicks, such as "Power Cards" which provided advantages to the team that played them. Jerma played the role of the umpire. This event was viewed by over 250,000 viewers online, and received financial support from sponsors Fansly and Manscaped.

On December 17, 2022, Jerma hosted the 'Jerma Christmas Special', initially posing as a straightforward end-of-year awards stream. Instead, the main channel was then 'hacked' by The Extinguisher, in which he played Call of Duty: Modern Warfare II's campaign mode as retribution for Jerma not playing Yakuza 0. This culminated in a live 1v1 between them, with the Extinguisher winning control of the channel. However, Santa Claus appeared and helped the two make amends. This stream was produced by Beyond The Summit, an esports production company.

At the end of February 2023, Jerma revealed that Grotto Beasts! was officially being released nearly two years after the initial reveal. The 'revamped' trading card game features art work from 20 different artists, including Jerma himself. There are currently 200 unique cards with four types: Grottos, Beasts, Wishes, and Challengers.

He has collaborated with other content creators, such as Ludwig Ahgren, Kitboga, and members of the Vinesauce streaming group.

Awards and nominations

References

External links 
 

1985 births
Living people
People from Boston
American YouTubers
American people of Irish descent
American people of Polish descent
Twitch (service) streamers
YouTube channels launched in 2011
English-language YouTube channels
Surreal comedy
Gaming YouTubers
Streamer Award winners
Internet memes